Minnesota State Highway 224 was a short  state highway connecting the unincorporated town of White Earth with U.S. Highway 59 at Ogema. The route was turned back to Becker County maintenance in 2005.

Route description

The route was legally defined as Legislative Route 224 in the Minnesota Statutes § 161.115(155).

History
Highway 224 was authorized on July 1, 1949 and paved by 1953. It was turned back to Becker County in 2005, and as part of the turnback agreement the roadway is slated to be reconstructed in 2013.

Major intersections

References

224